Ľubomír Belák (born 5 January 1951 in Bratislava) is a Slovak musician, vocalist, music composer and TV producer. His father Michal Belák was a presenter, singer and actor, and his mother Pavla Adámková Beláková was a singer in choir of the Slovak National Theater. His older sister Jana Beláková was a singer and his younger sister Daniela Luthová is a vogue designer. In 1983 he graduated from Philosophical Faculty at the Comenius University in Bratilava.

Career
In 1960s Belák started in bigbeat group  formed at the basic school. Since 1968 his orchestra played with the Slovak popular singers Eva Kostolányiová and Karol Duchoň. Later with his sister Jana he created a vocal duo performing with his group "Skupina Ľuba Beláka". In 1981 he founded the rock group LBT that published an LP in the Opus Records. The same year he helped to produce another LP for popular entertainment duo Milan Lasica and Július Satinský.

Belák was a music director of various music festivals including Bratislavská lýra, Bratislavské džezové dni, etc. Since 1984 he worked at the Slovenská televízia.

From 1992 he is an independent TV producer, created TV shows include "Čo dokáže ulica", "Rhytmick", "Život zvaný droga", "Music klub", etc.

Discography 
 1980 – Karol Duchoň – skupina Ľuba Beláka
 1981 – Milan Lasica, Július Satinský a Jaroslav Filip  – Bolo nás jedenásť
 1981 – Rezsõ Soltész – Robot love
 1982 – Mixed Co. – Islands
 1983 – Radošinské naivné divadlo – Jááánošík (double album)
 2008 – Ľubo Belák – Bigbíťák

Film music 
 Autobus – short film 
 Droga – short TV film 
 Slovensko – medium long film 
 Slniečko na rukavičke – TV series 
 Mať tak o koliesko viac – animated TV series

TV production 
 Čo dokáže ulica (series) 
 Rhythmick (series) 
 Keď odchádza kapela (series)
 Príbeh zvaný droga (series) 
 Ide pieseň okolo (series) 
 Detektívka (music film of popular Slovak group Elán) 
 Papierové lásky (TV dramatization of the story with songs)

Theoretical research – mass communication 
 Projekt Verejnoprávnej televízie – 2006 
 Punk a nová vlna (dissertation work at Philosophical Faculty of Comenius University)

References 

The article contains text translated from Ľubo Belák on the Slovak Wikipedia. Retrieved 5 January 2019.

External links

Official homepage
Profile on the Slovak portal Osobnosti.sk
Profile on IMDb

1951 births
20th-century Slovak male singers
Slovak composers
Male composers
Musicians from Bratislava
Comenius University alumni
Living people
Slovak male musicians